Li Jinzi (李金子; Lǐ Jīnzǐ, born 4 March 1990 in Zhaodong, Heilongjiang Province) is a Chinese boxer. She studied at the Jilin Institute of Physical Education, and began boxing at the age of 14. Li won a bronze medal in the women's middleweight competition at the 2012 London Olympics.

See also
China at the 2012 Summer Olympics – Boxing

References 

1990 births
Living people
Chinese women boxers
Boxers at the 2012 Summer Olympics
Olympic boxers of China
Olympic bronze medalists for China
Olympic medalists in boxing
Asian Games medalists in boxing
Sportspeople from Heilongjiang
People from Suihua
Boxers at the 2010 Asian Games
Medalists at the 2012 Summer Olympics
Asian Games gold medalists for China
Medalists at the 2010 Asian Games
Middleweight boxers
AIBA Women's World Boxing Championships medalists
21st-century Chinese women